Christopher Atkin (born 7 February 1993) is an English professional rugby league footballer who plays as a  or  for the Salford Red Devils in the Betfred Super League and the England Knights at international level. 

Atkin also played for Hull Kingston Rovers in the Championship and the Super League.

Background
Atkin was born in Widnes, Cheshire, England. He is a graduate of Liverpool John Moores University. Atkin is also a qualified teacher, previously teaching Physical Education at Wade Deacon High School in Widnes.

Early career
Atkin was in the Widnes Vikings' Academy System and he has previously played for the England Students in the 2013 Student Rugby League World Cup.
Atkin was then eventually released by the Widnes Academy System due to them already having two established young halves in Tom Gilmore and Danny Craven.

Senior career

Swinton (2014-17)
Between 2014 and 2017, he played for Swinton on a part-time basis under Head Coach, John Duffy. Atkin was the hero in the Swinton's 2015 play-off semi-final victory over the York City Knights, slotting over the match-winning drop-goal in golden-point extra-time, to secure their spot in the 2015 play-off final. Once again, Atkin's impressive performance in the 2015 play-off final against the Keighley Cougars proved to be the difference at the final whistle. Swinton gained promotion to the Championship with a thrilling 29-28 victory over Keighley, with Atkin scoring a try and kicking over a drop-goal, which proved to be the deciding factor come the end of the match. Atkin proved to be a pivotal player in Swinton's 2016 Championship campaign. Atkin recorded exactly one-hundred appearances for Swinton and he scored over seven-hundred points in the process.

Hull Kingston Rovers (2017 - 2019)
Atkin was originally slated to join Hull Kingston Rovers in the 2018 season, but due to financial difficulties at Swinton, Hull Kingston Rovers agreed to pay the Swinton club a five-figure transfer fee to secure Atkin's services with immediate effect during the dying stages of the 2017 season.
On 23 July 2017, Atkin made his Hull Kingston Rovers début against Halifax, in a 28-6 Championship league defeat.
Atkin was part of the Hull Kingston Rovers side that won promotion back to the Super League, at the first time of asking following relegation the season prior.

Following an impressive start to his  Hull Kingston Rovers career in the latter-stages of the 2017 Championship season, Atkin was quickly handed his Super League bow in round two against Leeds in 2018, where he won the Sky Sports' 'Man-of-the-Match' Award.
Atkin scored his first try for Hull Kingston Rovers on 2 April 2018, in a 44-6 Super League defeat against Wigan at the DW Stadium.

Salford (2020 - present)
In round 10 of the 2021 Super League season, Atkin kicked the winning field goal for Salford in their 9-8 victory over Huddersfield.

Representative career

England Knights (2018)

2018
It was announced by the Rugby Football League on 7 March 2018, that Atkin had been selected in the 25-man England Knights' Performance Squad, that would be touring Papua New Guinea for a two-game Test match series later in the year.

Atkin made his début for the England Knights against Papua New Guinea on 27 October 2018, the game played in Lae ended in a 12-16 victory to the Knights. He played against Papua New Guinea at the Oil Search National Football Stadium.

References

External links
Hull Kingston Rovers profile
Swinton Lions profile
SL profile

Living people
1993 births
England Knights national rugby league team players
English rugby league players
Hull Kingston Rovers players
Rugby league fullbacks
Rugby league halfbacks
Rugby league players from Widnes
Salford Red Devils players
Swinton Lions players